William Riley Moultray (September 10, 1852 – November 20, 1930) was an American politician in the state of Washington. He served in the Washington State Senate from 1901 to 1905.

References

1852 births
1930 deaths
Republican Party Washington (state) state senators
Republican Party members of the Washington House of Representatives